A. communis may refer to:
 Amara communis, a species of beetle in the family Carabidae
 Amygdalus communis, a synonym for Prunus dulcis, the almond tree, a species of plant native to the Middle East
 Anicetus communis, a parasitic wasp species

See also 
 Communis (disambiguation)